Luna Fulgencio Sánchez (Madrid, 5 February 2011) is a Spanish actress who became known for playing the role of Rocío in the films Padre no hay más que uno (2019) and Padre no hay más que uno 2 (2020), directed by Santiago Segura, in addition to her multitudinous appearances in Spanish television series.

Biography 
Luna Fulgencio was born in Madrid on 5 February 2011 as the youngest daughter of Rubén Fulgencio and Laura Sánchez, who, in addition to being her mother, is her agent. She has a brother, two years older than her, named Rubén Fulgencio, who is also dedicated to the world of acting.

Trajectory 
She began in the world of acting in 2016, in an episode of El ministerio del tiempo. A year later, she starred in the Telecinco series Ella es tu padre. In 2019 she joined the cast of El embarcadero on Movistar+, alongside Álvaro Morte, Irene Arcos and  Verónica Sánchez. In cinema, she had her first participation in Oriol Paulo's feature film Durante la tormenta (2018). A year later, she starred in Santiago Segura's blockbuster Padre no hay más que uno (2019), in addition to its sequel Padre no hay más que uno 2: La llegada de la suegra (2020), where she became especially recognized.

In 2021 she starred in Macarena Astorga's La casa del caracol and Santiago Segura's ¡A todo tren!Destino Asturias, in addition to signing on as the protagonist of the film Héroes de barrio, by Ángeles Reiné, where she plays Paula. That same year she participated in the TVE series La caza.Tramuntana and starred in the fictions Besos al aire (Star) and Supernormal (Movistar+). In the summer of the same year, she began filming El refugio, a Christmas comedy directed by Macarena Astorga, where she shares the screen with Loles León, María Barranco, Antonio Dechent and Leo Harlem, among others, which premiered that same Christmas.

In 2022 she had a special participation in the comedy film El test directed by Dani de la Orden. She also returned to her role as Rocío for the third part of the film Padre no hay más que uno and it was announced that she had signed up for the feature film Lobo Feroz by Gustavo Hernández.

Filmography

Cinema

Television

Awards and nominations

References 

Living people
2011 births
Actresses from Madrid
Spanish film actresses
Spanish television actresses
21st-century Spanish actresses
Spanish child actresses